Maria Sergejeva (born 28 October 1992 in Tallinn) is an Estonian former competitive pair skater and model. With former partner Ilja Glebov, she is the 2007–10 Estonian national champion and represented Estonia at the 2010 Winter Olympics. Following her competitive retirement in 2010, Sergejeva performed worldwide in theatre and arena shows, including Disney on Ice, Fantasy on Ice, Illusion on Ice, Magic on Ice and The Snow King.

Sergejeva lives in London, England, and has been signed by BMA Models. She appeared in Fast and Furious spin of movie “Hobbs and Shaw” next to Dwayne Johnson and Jason Statham. She worked with Harry Styles on the skating scene in a One Direction music video for Night Changes.

Programs 
With Glebov

Competitive highlights
With Glebov

GP: Grand Prix; JGP: Junior Grand Prix

References

External links

 
 

Estonian female pair skaters
Living people
1992 births
Figure skaters from Tallinn
Figure skaters at the 2010 Winter Olympics
Olympic figure skaters of Estonia
Estonian people of Russian descent